S73 may refer to:

Aircraft 
 Bernard S-73, a French racing monoplane
 Savoia-Marchetti S.73, an Italian airliner
 Sikorsky S-73, an American helicopter proposal

Submarines 
 , of the Royal Canadian Navy
 , of the Indian Navy
 , of the Israeli Navy

Other uses 
 County Route S73 (Bergen County, New Jersey)
 S73, a postcode district for Barnsley, England